Push Up Records is a sublabel of Germany-based Tunnel Records. Under its flag were released almost only 12-inch singles, from 1999 to 2003.

External links
 Tunnel Records
 Release history on Discog.com

German record labels
Trance record labels